This list of Protestant authors presents a group of authors who have expressed membership in a Protestant denominational church or adherence to spiritual beliefs which are in alignment with Protestantism as a religion, culture, or identity. The list does not include authors who, while considered or thought to be Protestant in faith, have rarely expressed or declared their affiliation in a public forum.

Criteria for inclusion on the list are those authors that have received worldwide recognition for their contributions in religious literature. Areas of specialty and denominations are added according to consensus, as needed. Current specialties include the following:  

The list of authors is categorized according to denomination.

Anabaptist 
 Petr Chelčický (born c. 1390–died c. 1460) – 15th century political leader from Bohemia (now the Czech Republic)

Alliance 
 Ravi Zacharias – evangelical writer from India

Anglican 
 C.S. Lewis – author of Mere Christianity
 Diana Butler Bass – author and church historian
 Lancelot Andrewes (1555–1626) – English bishop and scholar, who oversaw the translation of the King James Version of the Bible
 Legh Richmond – The Dairyman's Daughter
 Maria Francesca Rossetti – author and nun
 James Madison (1751–1836) – fourth President of the United States (1809–1817), the “Father of the Constitution” and the key champion and author of the United States Bill of Rights
 Jakob Abbadie – Swiss writer
 Jakob Jocz – third generation Hebrew Christian
 Jupiter Hammon (1711–died c. 1806) – former slave and poet from New York
 Peter Heylin or Heylyn (1599–1662) – English clergyman and author of many polemical, historical, political and theological tracts
 Samuel Butler (1613–1680) – author of the religious and political satire Hudibras

Baptist 
 John Ankerberg (born 1945) – apologist from Chicago, Illinois
 Alfred James Broomhall
 Benjamin Broomhall (1829–1911) – missionary and administrator of the China Inland Mission from Bayswater, London
 Marshall Broomhall
 John Bunyan (1628–1688) – allegorical author of The Pilgrim's Progress from London, England
 Alice Blanchard Coleman (1858-1936) – missionary society leader; author of periodical religious literature
 Bob Cornuke (born 1951) – biblical archeologist from Colorado Springs, Colorado
 Martha Foster Crawford – writer and missionary 
 Thomas Dixon (1864–1946) – novelist, playwright, state legislator, and author of The Clansman from North Carolina
 John Gill (1697–1771) – biblical scholar and expository author from Horsleydown, Southwark, England
 Billy Graham (1918–2018) – radio, television, and crusade evangelist from Charlotte, North Carolina
 Marilla Baker Ingalls (1828–1902) – missionary to Burma 
 David Jeremiah (born 1941) – radio and television evangelist, pastor, and expository author from El Cajon, California
 Adoniram Judson (1788–1850) – missionary to Burma; translated the Bible from English to Burmese
 Benjamin Keach (1640–1704) – author of scriptural parables and catechism from Southwark, South London, England
 William Garrett Lewis
 John Piper
 Bernard Ramm – Christian apologetics
 John Rippon
 Charles Haddon Spurgeon
 Rick Warren
 Kenneth N. Taylor – linked to Moody Bible Institute
 E. W. Kenyon

Brethren 
 Lillian Resler Keister Harford – church organizer, editor, author
 K.V. Simon – poet from India

Congregationalist 
 John Adams – religious worker whose poems speak of "flaming piety"
 Thomas Binney – Congregationalist theologian and poet
 Samuel Dyer
 Jonathan Edwards
 William Ellis – missionary who wrote Madagascar Revisited
 George MacDonald – Congregationalist pastor
 John Milton – Paradise Lost
 Marilynne Robinson – Gilead, 2005 Pulitzer Prize winner
 John Updike – Rabbit, Run, raised Lutheran, later belonged to Congregationalist and Episcopalian congregations

Congregationalist and Puritan 
James Janeway

Lutheran 
 Mikael Agricola – founding figure in Finnish literature
 Marva Dawn – theological writing
 Garrison Keillor – humorist
 John Warwick Montgomery – Christian apologetics
 Hallgrímur Pétursson – Lutheran priest, poet, and hymnodist

Methodist (inclusive of the holiness movement) 
 William F. Albright – Methodist archaeologist who writes on Bible archaeology
 Esther E. Baldwin – missionary, teacher, translator, writer, editor
 Julia Colman – temperance educator, activist, editor, writer
 Edward Eggleston – Methodist minister and author
 Arno Clemens Gaebelein – Methodist minister and writer
 Annie Ryder Gracey – author and missionary
 Phoebe Knapp – Methodist hymnwriter
 Augustus Baldwin Longstreet – Methodist minister and humorist
 Mary A. Miller – Methodist historian, editor, and publisher
 William Williams Pantycelyn – Methodist hymnwriter
 George Whitefield
 Alice May Douglas – author of poetry, juvenile literature, non-fiction; newspaper editor
 Daniel Sidney Warner – Church of God minister and founder of Gospel Trumpet Flyer

Moravian and Hussite 
William Cornelius Reichel, historian

Pentecostal 
 Benny Hinn – preacher and author
Jimmy Swaggart - preacher and author

Plymouth Brethren 
 Arthur Charles Gook – English to Icelandic translations of literature, poems, and hymns

Presbyterian 
 Pearl S. Buck – parents were missionaries, but she later left the religion
 Belle Caldwell Culbertson  - foreign missionary, home missionary, author on religious matters, and philanthropist
 Elisabeth Elliot – missionary
 Johnny Hart – cartoonist, on the evangelical end of Presbyterianism
 Emrys ap Iwan – Welsh Presbyterian minister who wrote for newspapers, etc.
 Timothy Keller – Senior pastor of Redeemer Presbyterian Church in New York City, author of The Reason for God.
 Catherine Marshall – author of "Christy" and "A Man Called Peter"
 John Ortberg – Senior pastor of Menlo Park Presbyterian Church, author of If You Want to Walk on Water, You've Got to Get Out of the Boat.
 Robert Louis Stevenson – wrote on religious matters at times
 Thomas Vincent
 Andrew Young – poet and botanical writer (later an Anglican priest)
 Frederick Buechner – novelist, theologian, and minister
 Horatius Bonar – minister in the Free Church of Scotland and a poet
 Alexander Campbell Cheyne – Scottish ecclesiastical historian
 Henry Drummond – Free Church of Scotland writer
 George Adam Smith – books concerning the Bible
 Francis Schaeffer

Quaker
 Bathsheba Bowers
 Esther G. Frame
 Sally Nicholls
 Eric Knight
 William Cooper

Reformed 
 Nicolaas Beets – novelist and poet
 Corrie ten Boom – memoirist
 Edward Tanjore Corwin – history writing
 James Isaac Good – history writing
 Martha Hooper Blackler Kalopothakes – missionary, journalist, translator
 Andrew Murray – religious and inspirational writing

United Protestant 
 Ralph Connor – Canadian clergyman and bestselling novelist

Other 
 Edith Jessie Archibald – suffragist and writer
 Ethel Barrett – Christian author and children's author
 Mary Charlotte Ward Granniss Webster Billings – writer, activist, hymn writer, evangelist, missionary
 Ted Dekker – bestselling novelist
 Henry Grattan Guinness
 Jerry B. Jenkins – co-author of the Left Behind books and Gil Thorp comics
 Hal Lindsey – end-times author
 Josh McDowell – Christian writer
 Ra'ouf Mus'ad – Protestant playwright of Coptic ancestry
 J. Dwight Pentecost
 Geraldine Taylor
 Hudson Taylor
 Phyllis Wheatley (1753–died c. 1784) – former slave and poet from Boston, Massachusetts and Senegal, Africa

References 

Protestants
Authors
Authors